The 2012 United States presidential election in New York took place on November 6, 2012, as part of the 2012 United States presidential election in which all 50 states plus the District of Columbia participated. Voters chose 29 electors to represent them in the Electoral College via a popular vote pitting incumbent Democratic President Barack Obama and his running mate, Vice President Joe Biden, against Republican challenger and former Massachusetts Governor Mitt Romney and his running mate, Congressman Paul Ryan.

Barack Obama carried the state of New York by a landslide margin, winning 63.35% of the vote to Mitt Romney's 35.17%. As in previous elections, the Democratic ticket easily won, for the most part due to racking up great margins in New York City (which in and of itself makes up 42.2% of the state's population) and its metropolitan area. The city alone garnered Obama 1,995,241 votes (or 81.19% of the vote in the city). He also managed to win Staten Island (Richmond County) which he didn't get in 2008. Putnam County, which McCain won in 2008, was the only county in the NYC metropolitan area that Obama lost to Romney. The rest of his votes mostly came from Albany, Buffalo, Ithaca, Rochester, Syracuse, and their respective metropolitan areas, giving him a solid 28.18% lead over Romney. Obama even won in many rural counties. The Republicans won only in some rural parts of upstate and western New York.

New York was 1 of only 6 states to swing in President Obama's favor from 2008 to 2012, giving him the largest percentage of the vote for any presidential candidate in the state since 1964 and the second largest Democratic vote share in the state in history. Similar to New Jersey, some news outlets, such as the New York Times, have proposed that Obama's improved performance in these states – as opposed to worsened performances in areas like the Rust Belt – was due to his handling of Hurricane Sandy, which made landfall on October 29. Mayor of New York City Michael Bloomberg, a Republican-turned-Independent, endorsed Obama due to the federal government's handling of the hurricane.

As of 2020, this is the most recent time the Democratic nominee won the following counties: Cayuga, Cortland, Franklin, Madison, Niagara, Orange, Oswego, Otsego, Richmond (Staten Island), Seneca, St. Lawrence, Suffolk, Sullivan, Warren, and Washington. As of 2020, this is also the most recent election where New York voted to the left of Maryland, Massachusetts or California. Also as of 2020, this is the most recent presidential election in New York in which the Democratic nominee won more counties than the Republican nominee. In subsequent elections, despite Republicans winning more counties, they have been unable to break through the huge Democratic advantage in New York City and its suburbs, ensuring that the state has remained solidly blue.

Primaries

Democratic
Incumbent President Barack Obama ran uncontested in the Democratic primary, and it was therefore cancelled.

Republican

The 2012 New York Republican presidential primary took place on April 24, 2012.

By county, Romney won a plurality in every county, and a majority in all but 6: Niagara, Cattaraugus, Wyoming, Orleans, Schuyler, Herkimer and Oswego.

Paul finished second in most counties. Santorum finished second in Otsego County. Gingrich finished second in two geographic areas: a cluster of counties in the Catskills and Hudson Valley (Orange, Rockland, Sullivan, and Westchester) and in most of the counties of Western New York (Allegany, Cattaraugus, Erie, Genesee, Niagara, and Wyoming), in addition to Herkimer and Oneida counties. Gingrich's relative strength in Western New York, as well as in Herkimer, can be attributed to the continued popularity and efforts of Carl Paladino, who carried those counties in the previous gubernatorial election and campaigned on Gingrich's behalf. The majority of New York politicians had endorsed Romney while the primary election was still competitive.

General election

Candidate ballot access
 Mitt Romney/Paul Ryan, Republican
 Barack Obama/Joseph Biden, Democratic
 Gary Johnson/James P. Gray, Libertarian
 Jill Stein/Cheri Honkala, Green
 Virgil Goode/Jim Clymer, Constitution
 Peta Lindsay/Yari Osorio, Party for Socialism and Liberation
Write-in candidate access:
 Rocky Anderson/Luis J. Rodriguez, Justice

Results

Results by county

See full list of sources
See full list of sources

Counties that flipped from Democratic to Republican 

 Chautauqua (County Seat: Mayville)

Counties that flipped from Republican to Democratic 
 Richmond (coterminous with Staten Island, a borough of New York City)

By congressional district
Obama 24 of 27 congressional districts, including three held by Republicans.

Analysis
As expected, New York gave a landslide win to Obama, with 4,485,877 votes, or 63.35% of the popular vote, 28.18% lead ahead of Romney. It was one of only six states to swing in Obama's favor from 2008, when he won with a 26.85% margin. New York has voted solidly for the Democratic candidate in every election since Michael Dukakis in 1988, which marked the end of its status as a swing state. This was the greatest ever percentage of the vote won by a Democrat since Lyndon B. Johnson won 68.56% of the vote in his 1964 44 state-landslide.

The politics of New York State are dominated by the heavily populated area of New York City, which Barack Obama won in a historic landslide, taking 81.19% of the vote and sweeping all 5 boroughs. Obama took 1,995,241 votes in New York City, to Mitt Romney's 436,889. No other presidential candidate of either party has ever received more than 80% of the vote in New York City. This was not only due to its majority liberal and extremely diverse population. His performance in New York City likely contributed to his improvement from 2008, which was unusual compared to the rest of the country where he underperformed from 2008 (particularly in areas like the Midwest and Rust Belt). He managed to flip Staten Island, which voted for John McCain in 2008, as well as improved his margins in all other boroughs except for Manhattan. This improved performance is likely attributable to Hurricane Sandy, which made landfall on October 29 and had devastating effects on the state, killing 44 people, destroying 250,000 vehicles and 300 homes, damaging 69,000 residential units, and flooding of the New York City Subway, all tunnels within the city (except for the Lincoln Tunnel), many suburban communities. Areas that weren't directly affected by the hurricane were indirectly effected by power outages and major disruption to data communication. Staten Island was hit hardest, with its geographical position combined with weather patterns, causing a 16 feet-high storm tide at its peak, flooding major residential areas. 23 of the 44 deaths from the hurricane were in Staten Island. The federal government's powerful and coordinated response to the hurricane was praised by those on both sides of the isle, garnering Mayor of New York City Michael Bloomberg's endorsement, as well as praise from Republican politicians like then New Jersey Governor Chris Christie. This – combined with the media's heavy criticism of Romney's support for a 40% budget cut to FEMA, which would grow to as much as 60% in the coming years – weakened Romney's performance amongst voters across city, including conservatives, especially in the borough of Staten Island.

The advantage from Hurricane Sandy was also reflected in polls. Prior to the storm, nine nationwide polls listed in Real Clear Politics' database found Romney and Obama each leading in four and one tied. Seven national polls taken after the storm had shown Obama leading in three, four being tied, and Romney leading in none. In particular, a poll by Politico and George Washington University found Obama's lead increasing in the Northeast from 8 to 20% before and after the storm.

Unlike many rural areas across the country, most notably in the Midwest, rural counties didn't swing especially hard against Obama this election. Most of the political landscape looked roughly the same, with the exception of Chautauqua County flipping red this election after supporting Obama by narrow margins in 2008, thus making Obama the first Democrat to win the White House without carrying this county since Jimmy Carter in 1976. However, Obama tied with Romney for white voters (who make up a majority of upstate's population but a minority in New York City) according to New York Times exit polls this election, a significant decline from 2008 when he won white voters 52 to 46. Discounting New York City's votes, Obama still would have carried New York State, albeit by a closer margin. Excluding New York City, Obama's vote total in the state was 2,490,636 to Romney's 2,053,607, giving Obama a 54.03%-44.54% win outside of NYC.

In terms of exit polls, Obama performed roughly as expected. He won both women and men 68 to 31 and 58 to 42, respectively, and won Black voters 94 to 5 and Hispanic voters 89 to 11. These ethnic groups collectively make up 54.6% of New York City's population, and thus hold great influence. Obama won all age groups, education levels, and income levels, though he did best amongst 18 to 29 year olds (72 to 25), those with no college degree (66 to 34), and those with an income under $30,000 (81 to 17), respectively. Obama not only won liberals and registered Democrats, but he also won moderates and independents 63 to 36 and 50 to 44 respectively – these groups make up 42% and 23% of the electorate respectively and were thus vital for Obama to win.

See also
 United States presidential elections in New York
 2012 Republican Party presidential debates and forums
 2012 Republican Party presidential primaries
 Results of the 2012 Republican Party presidential primaries
 New York Republican Party

References

External links
The Green Papers: for New York
The Green Papers: Major state elections in chronological order

United States president
New York
2012